The 6th General Assembly of Nova Scotia represented Nova Scotia between November 1785 to 1793.

The Assembly sat at the pleasure of the Governor of Nova Scotia, Edmund Fanning until 1786, and then under Governor John Parr.

Sessions
In 1785, the Speaker of the House was Sampson Salter Blowers In 1789, the speaker was Richard John Uniacke.
A writ for the election of the 6th General Assembly of Nova Scotia was issued on 21 October 1785, returnable by 1 December 1785.  The assembly convened on 5 December 1785, held seven sessions, and was dissolved on 22 January 1793.

Governor and Council
At the convening of the assembly:
Governor: John Parr
Lieutenant Governor: Edmund Fanning

After April 1786:
Governor-in-Chief  of British North America: Guy Carleton 
Lieutenant Governor: John Parr -died 25 November 1791
Administrator: Richard Bulkeley -served as acting governor
Lieutenant Governor: Sir John Wentworth -named 14 May 1792

Technically, Gov. Carleton was appointed not as governor general, but as Governor of Quebec, New Brunswick, Nova Scotia, and St. John's Island (four simultaneous appointments).  Since a governor only has power when actually in their jurisdiction, the three additional appointments were effectively meaningless, with Lt. Gov. Parr serving as acting governor.

The members of the Council are currently under research.

House of Assembly

Officers
Speaker of the House:
Sampson Salter Blowers of Halifax County -appointed to Council 3 January 1788.
Richard John Uniacke of Halifax County -elected 5 March 1789.
Clerk of the House: James Boutineau Francklin
Sergeant at Arms: Adolphus Veith -appointed 10 March 1790

Division of seats
The customary assignment of seats was continued: 4 seats assigned to Halifax County, 2 seats to the other counties and to Halifax Township, and 1 seat to the other townships, for a total of 39 seats.

Sunbury County, Sackville Township and Cumberland Township were no longer represented, as they had become part of the Province of New Brunswick in 1784.  Digby Township, Shelburne Township, Shelburne County, and Sydney County had been newly established and were granted representation.

Members
Amherst Township
William Freeman -election declared invalid 9 December 1785, not an inhabitant.
Charles Hill -by-election, took seat 8 June 1786.
Annapolis County
Thomas Henry Barclay
David Seabury -election declared invalid 8 December 1785, re-elected, took seat 10 June 1786, election again declared invalid 15 June 1786.
Alexander Howe -declared duly elected, took seat 15 June 1786.
Annapolis Township
Col. Stephen De Lancey -appointed to office in the Bahamas, seat declared vacant 6 April 1789.
James Delancey -by-election, took seat 26 February 1790.
Barrington Township
Joseph Aplin -took seat 21 December 1785, seat declared vacant 6 April 1789, having been out of the province for two years.
Gideon White -by-election, took seat 1 March 1790.
Cornwallis Township
Benjamin Belcher -took seat 8 December 1785.
Cumberland County
John Butler Dight
Christopher Harper -seat declared vacant 7 December 1785, not an inhabitant.
Philip Marchington -by-election, took seat 8 June 1786.
Thomas Watson -improperly elected due to error in the writ.  He petitioned on 14 June 1786 to take Harper's seat, but Marchington had already been seated.
Digby Township
Thomas Millidge -took seat 10 June 1786.
Falmouth Township
Jeremiah Northup -apology for non-attendance accepted on 16 June 1791.
Granville Township
Benjamin James
Halifax County
Sampson Salter Blowers -appointed to Council 3 January 1788.
Charles Morris (1759–1831) -by-election, 22 February 1788, took seat 12 March 1789.
Richard John Uniacke
John George Pyke
Michael Wallace
Halifax Township
John Fillis
William Cochran
Hants County
Benjamin DeWolf
Winckworth Tonge -died 2 February 1792.
George Henry Monk -by-election, took seat 18 June 1792.
Horton Township
Gurdon Denison -apology for non-attendance accepted on 23 June 1791.
Kings County
Jonathan Crane
Elisha Lawrence -resolved 6 April 1789 seat to be declared vacant if he did not attend the next session, but he did attend.
Liverpool Township
Ephraim Dean -died on 27 January 1787.
George William Sherlock -by-election, 14 March 1787, took seat 25 October 1787.  Election declared invalid 13 November 1787, reelected 11 December 1787, took seat 5 March 1789.
Londonderry Township
James Smith -seat declared vacant 6 April 1789 as a public defaulter.
Robert McElhinney -by-election, took seat 25 February 1790.
Lunenburg County
Dettlieb Christopher Jessen
John William Schwartz
Lunenberg Township
Casper Wollenhaupt
Newport Township
John Day, Jr. -resigned 8 June 1791, appointed sheriff of Hants County.
William Cottnam Tonge -by-election, took seat 8 June 1792.
Onslow Township
Charles Dickson -took seat 12 December 1785.
Queens County
Simeon Perkins
Benajah Collins -took seat 17 June 1786.
Shelburne County
Alexander Leckie -took seat 17 December 1785 after election was contested and declared valid.
Charles McNeal -took seat 17 December 1785 after election was contested and declared valid.
Shelburne Township
Isaac Wilkins -took seat 17 December 1785 after election was contested and declared valid.
Sydney County
James Michael Freke Bulkeley -took seat 8 June 1786.
James Putnam -took seat 8 June 1787.
Truro Township
Matthew Archibald
Windsor Township
John McMonagle
Yarmouth Township
Samuel Sheldon Poole

Note:  Unless otherwise noted, members were elected at the general election, and took their seats at the convening of the assembly.  By-elections are special elections held to fill specific vacancies.  When a member is noted as having taking their seat on a certain date, but a by-election isn't noted, the member was elected at the general election but arrived late.

References

David Allison; "History of Nova Scotia", Bowen, Halifax, 1916. 
Journal and proceedings of the General Assembly of the province of Nova-Scotia ... summoned ... Halifax, the 5th December, 1785 ... (1785)

06
1785 in Canada
1786 in Canada
1787 in Canada
1788 in Canada
1789 in Canada
1790 in Canada
1791 in Canada
1792 in Canada
1793 in Canada
1785 establishments in Nova Scotia
1793 disestablishments in Nova Scotia